The areani or arcani were a force of the Roman Empire, based in Roman Britain during the later part of the Roman occupation of the island. They had played some part in the campaign of Constans in Britain in 343; later they helped to instigate the Great Conspiracy in 367-368. Due to their participation in the Conspiracy, Count Theodosius disbanded them.

The term areani is a hapax legomenon, occurring once only, in a passage in Ammianus:

The duties that Ammianus describes, traveling and reporting the news of the tribes to Roman leaders, are appropriate to military scouts. They may have lived in the paramilitary zone between the Antonine Wall and the Vallum to the south. The term "areani" means "people of the sheep-folds", and many of the homesteads in their frontier region were indeed sheep-folds.

It has been suggested that the term is a misreading of "arcani", the secret ones. The term "arcanus" is known from Hadrian's Wall; Vindolanda tablet 162 bears the text "miles arcanu...", written in a good capital hand.

References 

Late Roman military units
Defunct intelligence agencies